Auntie Aubrey's Excursions Beyond the Call of Duty is a remix compilation by The Orb released in 2001.  The US and UK editions featured different track listings.  All tracks are remixes by The Orb.

UK Track listing

Disc 1
The KLF - "3 a.m. Eternal" (Blue Danube Orbital Mix) (7:40)
Primal Scream - "Higher Than the Sun" (Battersea Shield Mix) (6:20)
Wendy & Lisa - "Staring at the Sun" (Blinding Mix) (8:34)
The Orb & Robbie Williams - "I Started a Joke" (I Started an Orb Mix) (4:27)
The Orb - "Once More" (FT Explore Satan Mix) (4:46)
Lisa Stansfield - "Time to Make You Mine" (In My Dreams Mix) (9:58)
Rick Wright - "Runaway" (Leggit Dub) (13:38)
Art of Noise - "Art of Love" (Youth & Orb Mix) (4:26)
Tubeway Army - "Jo the Waiter" (Bon Apètit Mix) (9:32)
Penguin Cafe Orchestra - "Music for a Found Harmonium" (Pandaharmoniumorb Mix) (4:56)

Disc 2
Mike Oldfield & The Orb - "Sentinel" (Nobel Prize Mix) (14:24)
System 7 - "Miracle" (Orb Remix) (6:10)
Can - "Halleluwa" (Halleluwa Orbus II) (9:09)
The Grid - "Crystal Clear" (Crystal Clear Water Revival Mix) (7:17)
Meat Beat Manifesto - "Radio Babylon" (Beach Blanket Bimboland Mix) (12:38)
Tangerine Dream - "Towards the Evening Star" (Mandarin Cream Mix) (8:23)
Witchman - "Angel Art" (The Tale of The Orb Remix) (6:17)
The Damage Manual - "Sunset Gun" (Full Monty Sunny Orb Up Mix) (5:05)
Yasuaki Shimizu - "Morocco Mole" (6:46)
Mindless Drug Hoover - "The Reefer Song" (Grass Garden of Child's Mix) (3:04)

US Track listing

Disc 1
Pato Banton - "Beams of Light" (Depths Of An Ocean Lovemix) (7:53)
System 7 - "Miracle" (Orb Remix) (6:34)
Can - "Halleluwah" (Halleluwah Orbus II) (8:39)
The Grid - "Crystal Clear" (Crystal Clear Water Revival Mix) (7:23)
Meat Beat Manifesto - "Radio Babylon" (Beach Blanket Bimboland Mix) (12:36)
Tangerine Dream - "Towards the Evening Star" (Mandarin Cream Mix) (8:24)
Witchman - "Angel Art" (The Tale of The Orb Remix) (6:17)
The Damage Manual - "Sunset Gun" (Full Monty Sunny Orb Up Mix) (5:01)
Yasuaki Shimizu - "Morocco Mole" (6:50)
Mindless Drug Hoover - "The Reefer Song" (Grass Garden of Child's Mix) (3:05)

Disc 2
Lisa Stansfield - "Time to Make You Mine" (In My Dreams Mix) (9:22)
West India Company - "O Je Suis Seul" (Orient Express Mix) (7:28)
Fischerman's Friend - "Money" (Orb Club Mix) (6:24)
Delkom - "Superjack" (Orbital Infusion 2000) (5:56)
Sun Electric - "Red Summer" (Orb Koskiewicz Mix) (7:21)
System 7 - "Sunburst" (Orb Remix) (8:50)
Richard Wright - "Runaway" (R. Wright's Leggit Mix) (13:42)
Tubeway Army - "Jo the Waiter" (Bon Apetit Mix) (9:50)
Penguin Cafe Orchestra - "Music for a Found Harmonium" (Pandaharmoniumorb Mix) (4:53)

References

The Orb albums
2001 remix albums
Deviant Records remix albums